Radhe is a 2017 Nepalese romantic action social thriller film, written and directed by Jagadishwor Thapa, and produced by Sushil Pokhrel. The film stars Nikhil Upreti, Priyanka Karki, Ashishma Nakarmi and Salon Basnet in the title roles, along with Pramod Agrahari and Shishir Bhandari. The film is about a man named Radhe who loves Priya but one day he leaves the village without anyone's notice than he joins the Nepalese army to fight for his country. The film was one of the successful film that was released that year and was successful at the box office, it was estimated the film earned 3 cores in two days.

Plot 
Radhe who lives with mother and has love for a girl named Priya but Priya's father doesn't allow him to marry her because of their financial statues than one day Radhe leaves the village without anyone's notice, after leaving the village he meets a man in the journey than lives with him than after while Radhe joins the army.

Cast 
 Nikhil Upreti as Radhe
 Priyanka Karki as Priya
 Salon Basnet as Radhe's Friend
 Ashishma Nakarmi
 Pramod Agrahari
 Shishir Bhandari

Soundtrack

Controversy 
 While filming, the main actress Priyanka Karki fainted and she was unconscious for about 10 minutes.

References 

Nepalese romantic drama films
Nepalese thriller films